"I'd Surrender All" is a song co-written and recorded by American country music singer Randy Travis.  It was released in March 1992 as the fourth and final single from his album High Lonesome, it peaked at number 20 in the United States and number 13 Canada. The song was written by Travis and Alan Jackson.

Chart performance
"I'd Surrender All" debuted on the U.S. Billboard Hot Country Singles & Tracks for the week of April 4, 1992.

References

1992 singles
Randy Travis songs
Songs written by Alan Jackson
Songs written by Randy Travis
Song recordings produced by Kyle Lehning
Warner Records singles
1991 songs